Manuel Mama Samba Baldé (born 14 November 2002) is a professional footballer who plays as a goalkeeper for Vizela. Born in Portugal, he plays for the Guinea-Bissau national team.

Club career
Baldé is a youth product of the academies of Imortal, Benfica, and Aves. He signed a professional contract with Vizela in 2020, and extended his contract on on 19 July 2021, after they achieved promotion to the Primeira Liga.

International career
Born in Portugal, Baldé is of Bissau-Guinean descent. He was called up to represent the Guinea-Bissau national team at the 2021 Africa Cup of Nations. He debuted with Guinea-Bissau in a friendly 3–0 win over Equatorial Guinea on 23 March 2022.

References

External links
 
 

2002 births
Living people
People from Albufeira
Bissau-Guinean footballers
Guinea-Bissau international footballers
Portuguese footballers
Portuguese people of Bissau-Guinean descent
Association football goalkeepers
F.C. Vizela players
Sportspeople from Faro District